Homungellidae is a family of nematodes belonging to the order Rhabditida.

Genera:
 Homungella Timm, 1966

References

Nematodes